Mel Pemble is a Canadian para alpine skier, and para cyclist. She won gold medals in Omnium P3 and Scratch race P3, at the 2022 UCI Para-cycling Track World Championships.

Career 
She competed at the 2018 Winter Paralympics. She finished eleventh in Women's giant slalom, and Women's Super-G, and ninth in Women's downhill and Women's super combined. She did not finish in Women's slalom.

She competed at the 2019 World Para Alpine Skiing Championships .

She competed at the 2022 UCI Para-cycling Track World Championships, winning a gold medal in omnium, and scratch race. She set a para-cycling world record in the 200-metre Sprint in 2022.

References 

Living people
Skiers
Track cycling
Year of birth missing (living people)